Lindneria is a genus of stiletto flies in the family Therevidae. There are about six described species in Lindneria.

Species
These six species belong to the genus Lindneria:
 Lindneria bellingeri Metz & Irwin, 2000 c g
 Lindneria browni Metz & Irwin, 2000 c g
 Lindneria dicosta Metz & Irwin, 2000 c g
 Lindneria penelopae Metz & Irwin, 2000 c g
 Lindneria thompsoni Metz & Irwin, 2000 c g
 Lindneria wintertoni Metz & Irwin, 2000 c g
Data sources: i = ITIS, c = Catalogue of Life, g = GBIF, b = Bugguide.net

References

Further reading

External links

 

Asiloidea genera
Therevidae